Anastasija Nikolovska (born 23 February 1998) is a Macedonian female handballer for WHC Gjorche Petrov and the North Macedonian national team.

She represented the North Macedonia at the 2022 European Women's Handball Championship.

References

External links

1998 births
Living people
People from Skopje